Edvin Muratović (Montenegrin Cyrillic: Едвин Муратовић) (born 15 February 1997) is a Luxembourgish footballer who plays as a forward for F91 Dudelange and the Luxembourg national team.

Career
Muratović played for the youth national teams of both Luxembourg and Montenegro. He made his senior international debut for Luxembourg on 7 October 2020 in a friendly match against Liechtenstein, which finished as a 1–2 home loss.

On 13 October 2020, he scored his first international goal, which, ironically, against Montenegro, the country of his origin. Luxembourg won the game 2–1 away.

Career statistics

International

International goals
Scores and results list Luzembourg's goal tally first.

References

External links
 
 
 

1997 births
Living people
Luxembourgian footballers
Luxembourg youth international footballers
Luxembourg under-21 international footballers
Luxembourg international footballers
Luxembourgian people of Montenegrin descent
Bosniaks of Montenegro
Luxembourgian expatriate footballers
Luxembourgian expatriate sportspeople in France
Expatriate footballers in France
Luxembourgian expatriate sportspeople in Germany
Expatriate footballers in Germany
Luxembourgian expatriate sportspeople in Belgium
Expatriate footballers in Belgium
Montenegrin footballers
Montenegro youth international footballers
Association football forwards
F91 Dudelange players
Luxembourg National Division players